Theodore Harmon "Buddy" Hayes (August 1, 1916 – April 26, 1997) was an American big band musician who was a member of the Lawrence Welk orchestra. His instruments were the bass and the tuba.

Early life 
Born in Weston, West Virginia, in a family of performers, he first started performing at age four with his parents' band.

Career 
Hayes joined the Welk Orchestra in 1954, a year before the Welk show went on national television, after a stint in the United States Army and with several other bands in the Greater Los Angeles area. During his tenure with the Maestro's band and television show, in addition to playing the bass and tuba also was a featured vocalist in comedic and novelty numbers. He remained with the Welk organization until his departure in 1966.

Personal life 
He continued to perform live and collected and restored old string basses until his death in 1997 at his home in Coos Bay, Oregon.

Discography
With Stan Kenton
The Kenton Era (Capitol, 1940–54, 1955)

Filmography

Film

Television

References 

1916 births
1997 deaths
American tubists
Guitarists from West Virginia
People from Coos Bay, Oregon
People from Weston, West Virginia
Lawrence Welk
20th-century American bass guitarists
Guitarists from Los Angeles
Guitarists from Oregon
American male guitarists
American male bass guitarists
20th-century American male musicians